The men's 200m Backstroke event at the 2006 Central American and Caribbean Games occurred on Monday, July 17, 2006, at the S.U. Pedro de Heredia Aquatic Complex in Cartagena, Colombia.

Records

Results

Final

Preliminaries

References

2006 CAC results: Men's 200 Backstroke--prelims from the website of the 2006 Central American and Caribbean Games; retrieved 2009-07-02.
2006 CAC results: Men's 200 Backstroke--finals from the website of the 2006 Central American and Caribbean Games; retrieved 2009-07-02.

Backstroke, Men's 200m